William Harrison Hornibrook (July 6, 1884 – October 24, 1946) was an American publisher, politician, and diplomat.

Biography

Hornibrook, born on July 6, 1884 in Utah, started his career as a newspaper publisher in 1906; at one point or another, he owned both the predecessors to The Columbian and the Albany Democrat-Herald, along with various other papers.

In November 1906, he married Yolande Wilson, with whom he had two children, a son and a daughter.

A Democrat, Hornibrook was elected to the Idaho State Senate, from Twin Falls County, serving from 1911 to 1912, before his resignation.

He served as US ambassador to Thailand (then Siam) from 1915–1916, later as ambassador to Iran from 1934–1936 and Afghanistan from 1935–1936, while resident in Tehran. After the recognition of the Afghan government led by King Zahir Shah in August 1934, Hornibrook was appointed the first minister to Afghanistan.

From 1937–1941, he was ambassador to Costa Rica.

He died in March 1946, in Pacific Grove, California.

References

1884 births
1946 deaths
Ambassadors of the United States to Iran
Ambassadors of the United States to Thailand
Ambassadors of the United States to Costa Rica
Ambassadors of the United States to Afghanistan
Idaho state senators
20th-century American diplomats
20th-century American politicians